The eleventh series of Last of the Summer Wine aired on BBC1 in 1989. All of the episodes were written by Roy Clarke and produced and directed by Alan J. W. Bell.

Outline
The trio in this series consisted of:

List of episodes
Regular series

Christmas Special (1989)

DVD release
The box set for series ten was released by Universal Playback in September 2008, mislabelled as a box set for series 11 & 12.

References

See also

Last of the Summer Wine series
1989 British television seasons